Diane Chen (born September 17, 1979 in Alexandria, Virginia, United States) is an American figure skater who represented Taiwan in international competitions. She is a multiple Taiwanese national champion. Her highest placement at an ISU Championship was 19th at the 2005 Four Continents Figure Skating Championships.

Results

References
 

American people of Chinese descent
American sportspeople of Taiwanese descent
Sportspeople from Alexandria, Virginia
1979 births
Living people